Gallant Bloom (foaled May 22, 1966 – June 7, 1991) was a plain brown filly sired by the great Gallant Man, also a plain brown horse. She was small and possessed a gentle temperament. And yet she regularly beat the best fillies and mares in America. She defeated both Shuvee and Gamely.

Racing career
She did not start well. In her two-year-old season, she was fast but inconsistent. She won her first two starts but then lost the next three by large margins. Gallant Bloom seemed to find her footing in an allowance race and followed that by taking the Matron Stakes by a romp. And then she met Shuvee for the first time. In her first meeting with the brilliant filly, Gallant Bloom blew a three length lead and was caught by Shuvee at the wire. Max Hirsch believed Gallant Bloom hadn't really lost to Shuvee; she beat herself. He put her into rigorous training. After that, Gallant Bloom won twelve stakes races in a row, beginning in 1968 at age two and ending in 1970. She came back and beat Shuvee in the Gardenia, and was voted two-year-old champion filly by Daily Racing Form. The rival Thoroughbred Racing Association and Turf & Sports Digest awards were won by Process Shot.

In 1969, Shuvee was a great success and seemed likely to win Three-Year-Old-Filly honors. Shuvee had won everything from the Alabama Stakes to the Ladies Handicap, defeating top older mares to achieve her victories. Shuvee became the second winner of the Triple Crown for Fillies.  But at the same time, Gallant Bloom won every race she ran, at any distance, on any surface at eight different race tracks, and in the process defeating Shuvee three times (the Gardenia, the Delaware Oaks, and the Gazelle Handicap), and Gamely once in the Matchmaker Stakes. For this, Gallant Bloom was awarded the top Three-Year-Old Filly even though Shuvee had seemed the out and out winner early in the season. That year, Shuvee did not receive a single vote; it was a Gallant Bloom rout. Gallant Bloom also won the Daily Racing Form award for Champion Female Handicap Horse.

Max Hirsch died on April 3, 1969 at the age of 88. His son, Buddy Hirsch, took over the stable.

Buddy sent Gallant Bloom to California where she won top stakes at the age of four. But returning to race at tracks in the U.S. Northeast, she finally lost in the Nassau County Handicap. It was discovered she was developing a chip in her ankle which put an end to her racing career.

Breeding record
As a brood mare, Gallant Bloom puzzled veterinarians. She produced four foals, aborted one, and then became barren no matter what was tried. She had one last foal late in her life but nothing that came close to her.

Gallant Bloom lay down in her paddock at King Ranch, Kentucky, and died in 1991. She was twenty five years old. She is buried at Old Frankfort Place in Midway, Kentucky.

External links
  Gallant Bloom’s pedigree
 Gallant Bloom in the Hall of Fame

1966 racehorse births
1991 racehorse deaths
Racehorses bred in Kentucky
Racehorses trained in the United States
Thoroughbred family 4-d
American Champion racehorses
United States Thoroughbred Racing Hall of Fame inductees